Gustad is a surname. Notable people with the surname include:

 Aud Gustad (1917–2000), Norwegian trade unionist and politician
 Kaizad Gustad (born 1968), Indian film director and writer
 Randi Gustad (born 1977), Norwegian team handball player

See also
 Gaustad (surname)